Jan Poortvliet (born 21 September 1955) is a Dutch professional football coach and a former player who played as a left-back. He works as the coach of the Under-18 squad of FC Eindhoven He represented the Netherlands national team at the 1978 FIFA World Cup in Argentina. His biggest club successes came when he played for PSV Eindhoven in the mid- and late 1970s. After his retirement in the early 1990s he became a football manager, who worked for clubs like FC Den Bosch, RBC Roosendaal and Stormvogels Telstar. And aswell Southampton FC.

Managerial career

Southampton
On 29 May 2008, he was announced as the new head coach of English Football League Championship side Southampton as an immediate replacement to Nigel Pearson, with Mark Wotte taking over the Academy. In taking the Southampton job he became the club's 10th head coach in as many years as well as being the first foreigner to hold the position. But within days it emerged that Poortvliet was still employed by his previous club Helmond Sport who hadn't given him any permission to talk to Southampton. Poortvliet was offering to pay compensation to Helmond where he still had one year on his contract. But his offer of 30,000 Euros was taken as an insult by Helmond. The situation though was resolved via an arbitration panel (The Dutch FA – KNVB). Poortvliet was told he could take the Southampton job if he paid his former club Helmond Sport £60,000 (75,000 euros) in compensation.  He complied with these terms and his contract with Helmond Sport was terminated.

In his first official game in charge Southampton lost 2–1 to Cardiff, having conceded right at the end. However, three days later Poortvliet recorded his first win as Southampton manager, beating Exeter City 3–1 in the League Cup first round. His first league win came on 23 August at Derby County thanks to a David McGoldrick goal. Following a run of just one win in 14 home games, on 23 January 2009 Poortvliet announced his resignation from the club, with reserve team coach Mark Wotte taking over as head coach.

Later career
On 15 June 2009, Poortvliet was announced as the new manager of Eerste Divisie club FC Eindhoven. He led his side to qualification to the promotion/relegation tournament between Eredivisie and Eerste Divisie.

In June 2010 he was introduced as new head coach of Telstar, another Dutch Eerste Divisie team; his salary will however be paid by parent club AZ. After two lacklustre seasons at the Velsen-based club, in March 2012 it was confirmed Poortvliet had agreed to a move back to his previous club FC Den Bosch, effective from July.

Personal life
Poortvliet is the uncle of the Dutch footballer Jan Paul van Hecke.

References

External links

 Profile 

1955 births
Living people
People from Middelburg, Zeeland
Dutch footballers
Dutch football managers
Association football defenders
Netherlands international footballers
1978 FIFA World Cup players
UEFA Euro 1980 players
PSV Eindhoven players
Roda JC Kerkrade players
Nîmes Olympique players
AS Cannes players
Southampton F.C. managers
RBC Roosendaal managers
FC Den Bosch managers
Helmond Sport managers
Eredivisie players
Ligue 1 players
Belgian Pro League players
Association football utility players
English Football League managers
FC Eindhoven managers
SC Telstar managers
UEFA Cup winning players
Dutch expatriate footballers
Dutch expatriate sportspeople in Belgium
Expatriate footballers in Belgium
Dutch expatriate sportspeople in France
Expatriate footballers in France
Dutch expatriate sportspeople in England
Expatriate football managers in England
Dutch expatriate football managers
Footballers from Zeeland